The Edsel Bermuda is a station wagon that was produced and sold by Edsel in 1958. Like the Edsel Villager and Edsel Roundup station wagons, the Bermuda was built on a  wheelbase shared with Ford's station wagons, as well as core body stampings.

Overview 

The Bermuda represented the highest trim level available within the Edsel brand for a station wagon, and was only available during Edsel's introductory year of 1958. In addition to deluxe interior appointments, the Bermuda also was outfitted with simulated wood panels and frames, a hallmark of premium station wagon models produced by Ford and Mercury. The Bermuda came in six and nine-passenger configurations. To separate the Bermuda from Ford models, the Bermuda received Edsel's front fascia and vertical grille assembly as well as unique boomerang-shaped taillights. The shape of the taillights posed a problem when used as turn indicators – the left hand taillight appeared as an arrow pointing right and vice versa from a distance.

All station wagons shared the Edsel Ranger's engine availability with a  V8 as standard, as was a three-speed manual transmission. Buyers also had the option of a three-speed automatic transmission with a standard column-mounted gear selector, or could choose Edsel's highly promoted but trouble-prone Teletouch automatic, which placed its drive-selection buttons in a stationary steering wheel hub that the steering wheel rotated around.

While their roll-out was highly publicized in the fall of 1957, Edsels were a marketing disaster for Ford. Total Bermuda station wagon was 2,235 units, of which 1,456 were six-passenger models with a base price of $3,155 ($ in  dollars ) and 779 were nine-passenger versions priced at $3,212 ($ in  dollars ). This made the nine-passenger Bermuda the rarest 1958 Edsel model.

For the 1959 model year, the Bermuda and Roundup station wagons were dropped (as was the trouble prone Teletouch system), leaving only the Villager as Edsel's sole station wagon model.

Production numbers

References

External links 
 Edsel Spotters Guide
 Edsel.com History, specifications, resources for owners.
 Smith Motor Company Virtual Edsel Dealer
 The International Edsel Club
 Edsel.US Restorer's discussion group

Bermuda
Rear-wheel-drive vehicles
Station wagons
Cars introduced in 1958